Eilean Meadhonach is the second largest of the Crowlin Islands, located in the Inner Sound off the island of Skye, Scotland.

It is situated immediately to the west of Eilean Mòr, and to the north is Eilean Beag, both of which it is connected to at low tide. The larger figure may include Eilean Beag and the lower one Eilean Meadhonach alone at high tide.

Crowlin Harbour is at the northern end of the  gap between Eilean Meadhonach and Eilean Mòr and provides a natural shelter from westerly and southerly winds. It is also possible to anchor in a small pool at the centre of this strait.

Excavations on Eilean Mòr have shown evidence of Mesolithic human settlement and there are the remains of a midden and rock shelter on the north west coast of Eilean Meadhonach. Eilean Mòr has ruined cottages from historic times although there is no evidence of permanent recent habitation on Eilean Meadhonach. Eilean Beag has a light beacon and the remains of an old shieling.

Footnotes

References

External links

Uninhabited islands of Highland (council area)